The Sylvania Mountains are located in Inyo County, California and Esmeralda County, Nevada in the United States. The range trends in an east–west direction, north of the Last Chance Range at the northern end of Death Valley National Park.

The Last Chance Range and Death Valley are to the south, Slate Ridge is to the southeast, and the Palmetto Mountains are adjacent to the east.

Sylvania Mountains Wilderness
It is managed by the Bureau of Land Management.

References

Mountain ranges of the Mojave Desert
Mountain ranges of the Great Basin
Protected areas of the Mojave Desert
Mountain ranges of Nevada
Mountain ranges of Esmeralda County, Nevada
Mountain ranges of Inyo County, California
Bureau of Land Management areas in California